Alejandra Álvarez (born 24 July 1994) is an Ecuadorian tennis player.

Playing for Ecuador at the Fed Cup, Álvarez has a win–loss record of 6–3.

ITF finals (0–1)

Doubles (0–1)

References

External links 
 
 
 

1994 births
Living people
Ecuadorian female tennis players
21st-century Ecuadorian women